Poggio Rattieri  is a frazione of Torricella Sicura in the Province of Teramo in the Abruzzo region of Italy.

Frazioni of the Province of Teramo